Chalupa is a surname of Slavic language origin. In Czech, the word means "rural house" and the surname has a feminine form, Chalupová. In Polish and Ukrainian (transliterated Khalupa), it approximates to "house" in rural slang.

People
 Alexandra Chalupa, American political activist and daughter of Leo M. Chalupa
 František Chalupa (1828–1887), Czech painter and illustrator
 Jarmila Chalupová (1903–1988), Czech fencer
 Leo M. Chalupa (born 1945), American physiologist
 Lukáš Chalupa (born 1993), Czech ice hockey player
 Milan Chalupa (born 1953), Czech ice hockey player
 Tomáš Chalupa (born 1974), Czech politician
 Václav Chalupa (born 1967), Czech rower
 Václav Chalupa Sr. (born 1934), Czech rower
 Vladislav Chalupa (1871–1957), Czech-French cyclist 
 Zuzana Chalupová (1925–2001), Serbian naïve painter of Slovak origin

See also
 

Czech-language surnames
Polish-language surnames
Ukrainian-language surnames